Sidi Merouane District is a district of Mila Province, Algeria.

The district is further divided into 2 municipalities:
Sidi Merouane
Chigara

Districts of Mila Province